List of notable Old Portmuthians - that is, former pupils of The Portsmouth Grammar School. Alumni often join The Old Portmuthian Club, founded in 1885.

Born in the 19th century

Sir Oscar de Glanville (1867–1942), President of the Legislative Council of Burma
Roy Horniman (born Robert Horniman) (1868–1930), actor and theatre proprietor
William Macbride Childs (1869–1939), first vice-chancellor of the University of Reading
Benjamin Guy Horniman (1873–1948), journalist and supporter of Indian independence
Major Frank Harvey RMLI (1873–1916), awarded a posthumous Victoria Cross for bravery on board  at the Battle of Jutland (1916).
Cyril Garbett (1875–1955), Archbishop of York (1942–1955)
Percy F. Westerman (1876–1959), author of children's literature
Leonard Dawe (1889–1963), English amateur footballer, who later compiled crosswords for the Daily Telegraph newspaper

David Gammans (1895–1957) Conservative M.P.

Born in the early 20th century

Wally Hammond (1903–1965), England Cricketer and Captain
Prof. A. J. Arberry (1905–1969), translator and scholar in Arabic, Persian, and Islamic studies
Air Chief Marshal Sir Harry Broadhurst (1905–1995), Commander-in-Chief Allied Air Forces Central Europe
Sir Arthur Young (1907–1979), British and colonial police chief, police reformer
Harold Hall (1913–2004), civil servant and cricketer
Michael Ripper (1913–2000), film actor
Prof. G. E. L. Owen (1922–1982), classicist and philosopher
Alan Bristow (1923–2009), pilot and founder of Bristow Helicopters
James Clavell (1924–1994), novelist, screenwriter and director
Christopher Logue (1926–), critically acclaimed poet
Sir Malcolm Bates (1934–2009), chairman of London Regional Transport from 1999–2003
Sir Peter Viggers (1938–) MP for Gosport (1974–2010), gained national press attention during the 2009 expenses scandal for his duck house claim
Air Chief Marshal Sir Richard Johns (1939–), former Chief of the Air Staff
Prof. Andrew Lyne (1942–), former Director of Jodrell Bank Observatory
Major-General David Burden CB CVO CBE (1942–), Military Secretary (1997–1999)
Fred Dinenage, presenter of ITV's local news programme, Meridian Tonight
Paul Jones (1942–), singer with Manfred Mann
Sir Digby William David Cayley, (1944–), 11th Bt., Assistant Master between 1968 and 1973;  also Stonyhurst College, Abingdon School and Marlborough College.
Richard Simonsen, (1945–), athlete
Richard Bradley, (1946–), archaeologist and academic

Born in the later 20th century

Ian Osterloh (1960–), Clinical researcher attributed with the creation of 'Viagra' as well as numerous cardiovascular drugs.
Mel Stride (1961–), MP for Central Devon (2010–present).
Jock Clear (1963–), Formula One race engineer
Mike Wedderburn (1964–), TV sports presenter for Sky and Sky Sports News.
Ed Richards (1965–), Chief Executive of Ofcom.
Roger Black (1966–), Olympic athlete (silver medalist).
Andrew Burns(1969-), Royal Navy Admiral.
James Bobin (1972–), film director, writer and producer; worked as a director and writer on The 11 O'Clock Show, Da Ali G Show and directed The Muppets.
Dave Holby (1980–), Holder of three British and nineteen world indoor rowing records including the Guinness World Record for fastest solo row around the earth's equator.
Jake George (1994–), cricketer.
Robert Gibson (born 1994–), cricketer.

References

Portmuthians
Portsmouth-related lists